Ag Apolloni (born 13 June 1982) is an Albanian writer, poet, playwright, scholar and essayist. He is a professor at the University of Prishtina. His literary works are distinguished for their dramatic dimension, philosophical treatment and critical attitude towards history, politics and society.

Early life 

Ag Apolloni was born on 13 June 1982, in Kaçanik (Kosovo). He completed elementary school and gymnasium in his hometown, in 2001. Then, in 2005, he completed his Dramaturgy and Literature studies at the University of Prishtina. For economic reasons, he stopped studying Philosophy in 2006 and spent most of two years in Pristina Hospital taking care of his ailing father, who died in 2007. In 2008, Ag Apolloni takes over title of Master of Philological Sciences, and in 2012 receives the title Doctor of Philological Sciences. Apolloni is currently a professor at the University of Pristina, where he has been working since 2008.

Work 

Apolloni has worked as a journalist, editor and editor-in-chief in several daily newspapers and literary and cultural magazines in Pristina. In 2010 he reactivated and ran for three years the oldest literary magazine in Kosovo, "New Life" (in Albanian "Jeta e Re"), which was first founded in 1949, and closed in 2006. In 2013, he founded the cultural journal "Symbol", in which he conducted interviews with: Linda Hutcheon, Jonathan Culler, Rita Dove, Gottfried Helnwein, Andreas Huyssen, DM Thomas, Javier Cercas, Ann Jefferson, Peter Singer, Stephen Greenblatt, Stanley Fish, David Damrosch etc. Apolloni's works have been translated into several languages, such as: English, Dutch, German, Czech, Macedonian, Montenegrin, etc. Apolloni has been awarded national awards several times for his fictional and scholarly works.

Oeuvre 

Ag Apolloni started writing in 2003. In a café he had heard a war story about a criminal who had been collecting the eyes of his victims, and that story shocked him so deeply that he had created a monodrama overnight. This monodrama, called "Stephen, or the story of an eye collector", was published also  in the Austrian Journal, "Lichtungen".  During his studies he kept a poetic journal, which he published in 2009 under the title "Zomb". Whereas, in 2013 he publishes the novel "The Howl of the Wolf" (Albanian "Ulurima e ujkut"), where, through postmodern form, he combines pain with fury. The author spares no one, he criticizes everyone: himself, family, society, nation, world and God. After this novel, he writes the novel "Zazen" as an homage to a friend of him who, after finishing his studies at the Philosophy Branch, unable to find work in his native land, resentful of all, had decided to disappear and, after a few days, was found dead in an abyss. While Apolloni's plays provoke fear and compassion, as his poems transform intimate life into art, his prose is awe and rage. Whereas, studies of "Postmodern Parable" (Albanian "Parabola postmoderne") (2010), "The Paradigm of Proteus" (Albanian "Paradigma e Proteut") (2012) and reviews published in periodicals show a tendency to open up new research paths.

Novels

The Howl of the Wolf 

The novel "The Howl of the Wolf" (2013) addresses many themes from multiple angles. The novel also deals with painful separation with the living and the dead. The novel is rife with despair and fury, accompanied by a dose of humor, with references to music, painting, film and theater. Events are set in Kosovo, Macedonia, Albania, Montenegro, Italy and Austria, where the novel is completed. The novel "The Howl of the Wolf" is translated in Macedonian, Czech and Montenegrin.

Zazen 

"Zazen" (2014) deals with the fate of a young Kosovar, a friend of the author, who after graduation returns to his homeland, but this return becomes tragic for him, as he is neglected by the municipality, misunderstood by the village, declared insane from the family. "Zazen" interlinks a variety of topics: social, philosophical, political, national, religious, etc. It tells of Zen Zabel's anxiety and tragicomic life, which has many ideas, few demands and no possibilities.

Glimmer of Hope, Glimmer of Flame 

"Glimmer of Hope, Glimmer of Flame" (2020) is a docuroman (documentary novel) about the real tragedy of two Kosovo Albanian mothers from Gjakova, after the war of 1999: one lost her whole family - her husband and four sons - and continues to wait for them more than twenty years later; the other burned herself to death after the remains of two of her sons were returned to her. The novel is a mosaic of the ill-fortunes of war and the painful consequences of peace. It resonates with the powerful echoes and eternal truths of ancient Greek tragedy, but also with twentieth century human horrors; it explores the meaning of motherhood, and family, and home.
In 2022, it has been published in Dutch. The novel was praised by the Dutch theorist Mieke Bal as "a literary masterpiece worth being turned into a film." The novel has been promoted in The Hague, on the fifteenth anniversary of Kosovo’s independence.

Red Riding Hood: Fairytale for Grown Ups 

"Red Riding Hood: Fairytale for Grown Ups" (2022) is about a flirtatious Red Riding Hood and a sick Wolf. It is a love story and a walk through the magical forest of storytelling, where the characters enter the paths of mythology, fairy tale, religion, and animation. Screams and sighs, barks and bleats come as an allegorical confrontation that awakens the call of the wild within us.

This narrative uses cartoon logic within combinatorial art, where theatrical, film, and musical elements are combined; it is prose with poetry and drama inside. Set in a small country on the continent that took its name from a raped woman (Europe), it also talks about the rapes during the war in Kosovo and their consequences on peace. Also, one chapter, which talks about the desperate and lonely wolf, is located in Debrecen, where the novel was written.

The novel is built as a philosophical walk through a real and fabulous world. This is not a documentary novel, nor a pure fairy tale.

“Red Riding Hood: Fairytale for Grown Ups” has been written in Debrecen (Hungary), and it was published in Albania (by “Albas”) and in Kosova (by Bard Books), at the same time.

Plays

Drama 

The book "Drama: The story of an eyes collector, Halloween, Judith, Mat" (2010) contains three tragic dramas, which in the order of the number of characters openly display the reference to the origin of Greek drama and antique theater (to The story of an eyes collector, who has only one character, fantasy leads to Thespis's carriage; Halloween includes the second character, according to Aeschylus's model, while Judith enters the third character, modeled on Sophocles), as well as a text of Aristophanes' spirit, as a relaxation for the public. Monodrama The story of an eyes collector is a harrowing story of an eye collector living in his pantry with 4,998 eyes collected during the war in Bosnia and Kosovo. Apolloni wrote this work at the age of 21 as "an elegy for the last decade of the last century, namely a reminder of the crimes that shocked the world." Monodrama is a story that treats love and crime, life and death as a binomial that can shock the public. ”Halloween is an incestuous story about Halloween night. This drama was written by Apolloni, prompted by the reading of a feast on the life of serial killer Ted Bundy. Judith is a biblically motivated drama treated as a mythical story of the East-West conflict, of the misunderstanding between man and God, and of subjection and courage. Comedy Mat is a pastime built on the works of directors Ingmar Bergman and Woody Allen, on the ridiculous confrontation between man and death.

Hamlet according to Horatio 

"Hamlet according to Horatio" is a psychoanalytic tragedy embodying Freud's theoretical ideas to give a possible story of Hamlet, touching on the theme of double incest (brother-sister, mother-son) and the theme of multiple betrayals. "Hamlet according to Horatio" is a pastiche, or dramatic hypertext, built on Shakespeare's Hamlet and on Freud's interpretations of Hamlet as an imperfect Oedipus. Thematically, "Hamlet according to Horatio" is an alternate story, echoed by Oresteia, Oedipus Rex, and Hamlet. This drama, called “My Hamlet” as a working title, has been announced as the winner of the annual "Katarina Josipi" Drama Award.

Scanderbeg: Marlowe's Manuscript 

"Scanderbeg: Marlowe's Manuscript" is a play written according to the postmodern principle of manuscript, so as to find an Elizabethan drama of the 16th century which is considered a lost drama: "The True History of George Scanderbeg" by Christopher Marlowe. For the writing of this play the author has used many historical, literary, cinematographic and theatrical materials to create a credible reality of the Scanderbeg era. Here the hero presents himself between myth and reality, both a great and a human figure.

Poems

Zomb 

"Zomb" (2009) is a madrigal book. It contains a total of 100 poems and an epistle-shaped representation. The book begins with a provocative dedication ("My Friend's Wife"), with two verses from English poet John Milton ("If death joins me with you / it will be life for me"), as it unfolds in six units: Ouverture, Edenic Waltz, Dionysian Sonata, Siren Symphony, Requiem Eros and Coda. "Zomb" is an erotic-themed book, built on the principles of the medieval madrigal. It is a book that contains many elements of classical music, jazz, blues, rock, pop, etc.; from world cinema, from ancient, medieval, modernist, contemporary literature; and also from religions such as Buddhism, Totemism, Judaism, Christianity and Islam.

Non-fiction

My Middle Ages 

"My Middle Ages" is a book of autobiographical essays, also referred to as narrative-essayist autobiography. The book consists of 10 essays with Latin titles: Obscura, Vulgus, Doctrina, Pelegrin, Allegoria, Persona, Schisma, Templarius, Inquisitio and Memento, which cover the life of the author and present-day Kosovar actuality.

Critical books

Literary studies 

Apart from fiction, Ag Apolloni also deals with literary studies. He has so far published two study books: "Postmodern Parable" and "The Paradigm of Proteus". The first study, an extension of his master's thesis, is a monograph on the first postmodern Albanian writer, Rexhep Qosja. The second study, which is his doctoral thesis, is a monograph on the most translated Albanian novel, The General of the Dead Army, by Ismail Kadare. Also, in 2016 he published the book Konica's Suitcase, which is a collection of essays dealing with various issues of Albanian literature, such as its language, values, themes and functions of propaganda, historical, political, religious etc. It discusses the main authors, works and phenomena of this literature. In 2019 he started to publish a critical book called "Commentum", his major project in several volumes.

Bibliography

Poetry 

Zomb (2009)
Seneca's Sandals  (Albanian: Sandalet e Senekës), (2020)
The Rhetoric of Silence (Albanian: Retorika e heshtjes), (2021)

Novels 
The Howl of the Wolf (Albanian: Ulurima e ujkut), (2013)
Zazen (2014)
Glimmer of hope, glimmer of flame (Albanian: Një fije shprese, një fije shkrepëse), (2020)
Red Riding Hood: Fairytale for Grown Ups (Albanian: Kësulëkuqja: përrallë për të rritur), (2022)

Plays 
The Story of An Eyes Collector, Halloween, Judith, Mat, (2010)
Hamlet according to Horatio (Albanian: Hamleti simbas Horacit), (2017)
Skanderbeg: Manuscript of Marlowe (Albanian: Skenderbeu, manuskripti i Marlout), (2018)

Studies, essays 
The Postmodern Parable (Albanian: Parabola postmoderne), (2010)
The Paradigm of Proteus (Albanian: Paradigma e Proteut), (2012)
Konitza's Suitcase (Albanian: Koferi i Konicës), (2016)
Commentum (2019)

Autobiography 
My Middle Age(s) (Albanian: Mesjeta ime), (2019)

In other languages 

1. German: 
- Die Geschichte eines Augensammlers, translated by Andrea Grill. Published in “Lichtungen”, Graz, No 126, 2011.

2. Macedonian: 
- Завивањето на волкот, translated by Mirjana Ilieva Jashari. Goten, Skopje, 2015.

3. Czech:
- Vytí vlka, vlka vytí, translated by Orkida Backus Borshi. Kniha Zlín, Prague, 2019.

4. Dutch: 
- Een sprankje hoop, een lont, translated by Jan Jansen. Het Wereldvenster, Utrecht, 2022.

5. Montenegrin: 
- Vučji urlik, translated by Danilo Brajović. Zavoda za udžbenike i nastavna sredstva, Podgorica, 2022.

References 

1982 births
Living people
Albanian essayists
Albanian journalists
Albanian male poets
Albanian male writers
Albanian scholars
Albanian dramatists and playwrights
Academic staff of the University of Pristina